The straight engine (also called inline engine) is a piston engine where all of the cylinders are aligned in a row along the crankshaft.

Most straight engines have four or six cylinders, however straight engines have ranged from two cylinders to fourteen cylinders.

Design 
A straight engine is easier to build than an equivalent flat engine or V engine, since it uses one cylinder head rather than two. Inline engines are also narrower than flat engines or V engines, however they are longer and can be taller.

The engine balance characteristics of a straight engine depend on the number of cylinders and the firing interval.

Slant engines and horizontally-mounted engines 
When a straight engine is mounted at an angle from the vertical it is called a slant engine. Notable slant engines include the 1959-2000 Chrysler Slant-6 engine and the 1968-1981 Triumph Slant-4 engine.

Some buses and diesel multiple unit trains take this concept further by mounting the engines horizontally (i.e. with a slant angle of 90 degrees). This is used to reduce the height of the engine, so that it can be located under the floor of the train or bus.

Number of cylinders 

 Straight-twin engine
 Straight-three engine
 Straight-five engine
 Straight-six engine
 Straight-seven engine
 Straight-eight engine
 Straight-nine engine
 Straight-twelve engine
 Straight-fourteen engine

Usage in automobiles 
The straight-three and straight-four configurations are the most common layouts for three- and four-cylinder engines respectively. Straight-five engines are occasionally used, most recently by Audi and Volvo. Straight-six engines were common prior to the 1990s, however most six-cylinder engines now use a V6 layout. Similarly, straight-eight engines were popular in the 1920s to 1940s, however they were replaced by the more compact V8 layout.

Aviation use

Many straight engines have been produced for aircraft, particularly from the early years of aviation and through the interwar period leading up to the Second World War. Straight engines were simpler and had low frontal area, reducing drag, and provided better cockpit visibility.

Straight sixes were especially popular in the First World War, and most German and Italian and some British aircraft used descendants of Daimler's pre-war inline six. Prominent examples include the German Mercedes D.III and BMW IIIa, Italian Isotta Fraschini V.4 and British Siddeley Puma.

The British de Havilland Gipsy family of engines and their descendants included straight-four and straight-six upright and inverted air-cooled engines which were used on a wide range of smaller aircraft around the world, including on the Tiger Moth biplane, and helped made the configuration popular for light aircraft. Menasco and Fairchild-Ranger in the United States, Renault in France, Walter in Czechoslovakia, and Hirth in Germany all built a similar range of engines which were popular in their respective markets.

The aviation use of term "inline engine" is used more broadly than for straight engines, since it also applies to other configurations where the cylinders are located in rows (e.g. V engines, W engines, H engines and horizontally opposed engines).

Inverted engines 

Some straight aircraft engines have used an inverted engine configuration, whereby the crankshaft is at the top of the engine and the pistons hang downwards from it. Advantages of the inverted arrangement include a raised thrust line for improved clearance for the propeller, which either allows for the use of a larger, more efficient propeller, or for shorter undercarriage. Since the thrust line is higher, the engine can be mounted lower in the airframe, improving visibility forward, which is no longer blocked by the cylinder heads. It also allows for a simpler exhaust to keep gasses clear from the cockpit.

Motorcycle use

In motorcycling, the term "in-line" is sometimes used narrowly, for a straight engine mounted in line with the frame. A two-cylinder straight engine mounted across the frame is sometimes called a parallel twin. Other times, motorcycling experts treat the terms parallel, straight, and inline as equivalent, and use them interchangeably.

References 

Straight